The following lists events that happened during 1963 in South Vietnam.

Events

September
 September 27 - Parliamentary elections were held with President Ngo Dinh Diem winning 120 out of the 123 seats.

References

 
Years of the 20th century in South Vietnam
1960s in South Vietnam
South Vietnam
South
South Vietnam